Serum paraoxonase and arylesterase 1 (PON1) also known as A esterase , homocysteine thiolactonase or serum aryldialkylphosphatase 1 is an enzyme that in humans is encoded by the  PON1 gene. Paraoxonase 1 has esterase and more specifically paraoxonase  activity. PON1 is the first discovered member of a multigene family also containing PON2 and PON3, the genes for which are located adjacent to each other on chromosome 7.

Structure 
Human PON1 is a glycoprotein composed of 354 amino acids and has a molecular weight of 43000 Daltons which associates with high-density lipoprotein (HDL, cholesterol) in the circulation. Serum PON1 is secreted mainly by the liver, although local synthesis occurs in several tissues and PON1 protein is found in almost all tissues. X-ray crystallography has revealed the structure of PON1 to be a 6 bladed propeller with a unique lid structure covering the active site passage which allows association with HDL.

Function 
PON1 is responsible for hydrolysing organophosphate pesticides and nerve gasses. Polymorphisms in the PON1 gene significantly affect the catalytic ability of the enzyme.

PON1 (paraoxonase 1) is also a major anti-atherosclerotic component of high-density lipoprotein (HDL).  The PON1 gene is activated by PPAR-γ, which increases synthesis and release of paraoxonase 1 enzyme from the liver, reducing atherosclerosis.

The "natural" substrates for PON1 appear to be lactones. However, PON1 has evolved to be a highly promiscuous enzyme capable of hydrolysing a wide variety of substrates such as lactones (including a number of important pharmaceutical agents such as statins), glucuronide drugs, thiolactones, arylesters, cyclic carbonates, organophosphorus pesticides and nerve gases such as sarin, soman and VX, oestrogen esters and lipid peroxides (oxidised lipids).

Genetics 
PON1 in humans is encoded by the PON1 gene which is located on the long arm of chromosome 7. Although many nutritional, life-style and pharmaceutical modulators of PON1 are known., by far the biggest effect on PON1 activity levels, which can vary by over 40 fold between individuals, is through PON1 genetic polymorphisms. The coding region PON1-Q192R polymorphism determines a substrate dependent effect on activity. Some substrates e.g. paraoxon are hydrolysed faster by the R- isoform while others such as diazoxon and lipid-peroxides are hydrolysed more rapidly by the Q- isoform. Both the coding region PON1-L55M and the promoter region PON1-T-108C polymorphisms are associated with different serum concentrations and therefore activities. The 55L allele results in significantly higher PON1 mRNA and serum protein levels and therefore activity compared to the 55M allele. The -108C allele has greater promoter activity than the -108T allele which results in different serum activities.

The distribution of the PON1 polymorphisms varies with ethnicity. The frequency of the PON1-192R allele increases the further from Europe a population originates, the frequency in Caucasians of 15-30% increases to 70-90% in Far Eastern Oriental and Sub-Saharan African populations. In the southern US African-Americans are five times more likely to be RR than Caucasians. In contrast the PON1-55M allele is much less frequent in Oriental and black African populations compared to Caucasians and are extremely rare or absent in some populations e.g. Thais. These ethnic differences in SNP distribution can lead to large activity differences between populations.

Clinical significance 

PON1 was first discovered through its ability to hydrolyse and therefore detoxify organophosphorus compounds which are widely used as pesticides and nerve gases. Despite decades of research it is only now becoming clear that PON1 protects humans from the acute and chronic harmful effects of these compounds. Low PON1 activity found in children may increase their susceptibility to organophosphates. 
 
However, the greatest research interest has been the role of PON1 in atherosclerosis, where, because of its ability to remove harmful oxidised-lipids, PON1 protects against the development of atherosclerosis Oxidized polyunsaturated fatty acids (notably in oxidized low-density lipoprotein) form lactone-like structures that are PON substrates.

PON1 also protects against bacterial infection by destroying the bacterial signalling molecules that cause gram negative bacteria to invade human tissue and form colonies, thus PON1 contributes to the bodies innate immunity.

Recently it has been suggested that PON1 has a role in healthy aging, however, the mechanism is currently unknown.

PON1 activity is low in infants compared to adults. A study of Mexican-American children showed that PON1 activity increased 3.5 times between birth and age seven.

An association between PON1 gene polymorphism and susceptibility to Parkinson's disease was not found in a Chinese population.

Notes

References

Further reading